Buthalital sodium (INN; Bayinal, Baytinal, Thialbutal, Transithal, Ulbreval), or buthalitone sodium (BAN), is a barbiturate derivative which was under development as a short-acting anesthetic. However, development was discontinued, perhaps due to its extremely rapid elimination rate, and buthalital sodium was never marketed.

See also 
 Barbiturate

References 

General anesthetics
Thiobarbiturates
GABAA receptor positive allosteric modulators
Abandoned drugs
Allyl compounds